The Sun is a group of newspapers published in Charlotte, Sarasota, DeSoto, Hardee, and Highlands counties, in southwestern and central Florida.

Sun Coast Media Group newspapers include several "zoned editions" of the Charlotte Sun that cover coastal Charlotte County, inland DeSoto, Hardee and Highlands counties. The approximately 50-person reporting staff at the home office on Harbor Boulevard in Port Charlotte covers the small communities of Punta Gorda, North Port, Englewood, Venice, Arcadia.

The flagship newspaper, The Charlotte Sun, is a 30,000-circulation daily owned by Adams Publishing Group corporate group.

In addition to the newspaper, family enterprises include networked business communications and a monthly, regional-lifestyle magazine, Harbor Style.

More recently, the current publishers acquired The Arcadian, the Lake Placid Journal and several small weeklies in inland southwest Florida, which share content with the coastal editions. In December 2006, the parent group bought three Frisbie-family owned newspapers in Polk County: The Polk County Democrat, based in Bartow and founded in 1931 by the great-grandfather of the current owner, S.L. Frisbie IV. The paper publishes twice a week. The second paper is the twice weekly Fort Meade Leader, a 1969 spin-off of the Democrat, and the Lake Wales News, a 1998 Frisbie acquisition. The deal also included Polk County Times, "an 11,000 circulation monthly targeted at county government and public schools," according to a Dec. 15, 2007 news report by Bob Fliss, Charlotte-Sun Business News Editor.

Sources
^ Lindsey Williams—Writer At Large 
Official site: 

http://trendmag2.trendoffset.com/publication/?i=261767&p=68

http://ufdc.ufl.edu/UF00091470/00001/3j?search=derek+%3ddunn-rankin

Unofficial site:  

Newspapers published in Florida